Crassiclava omia is a species of sea snail, a marine gastropod mollusk in the family Pseudomelatomidae.

Description
Thel length of the shell attains 9.8 mm, its diameter 4.2 mm.

Distribution
This marine species occurs off Table Bay, South Africa.

References

 Kilburn R.N. (1988). Turridae (Mollusca: Gastropoda) of southern Africa and Mozambique. Part 4. Subfamilies Drillinae, Crassispirinae and Strictispirinae. Annals of the Natal Museum. 29(1): 167–320. page(s): 243, figs 185–186

External links
 

Endemic fauna of South Africa
omia
Gastropods described in 1958